Quick, Draw! is an online game developed by Google that challenges players to draw a picture of an object or idea and then uses a neural network artificial intelligence to guess what the drawings represent. The AI learns from each drawing, improving its ability to guess correctly in the future. The game is similar to Pictionary in that the player only has a limited time to draw (20 seconds). The concepts that it guesses can be simple, like 'foot', or more complicated, like 'animal migration'.

In a game of Quick, Draw!, there are six rounds. During each round, the player is given 20 seconds to draw a random prompt selected from the game's database whilst the artificial intelligence attempts to guess the drawing, akin to a game of Pictionary. A round ends either when the artificial intelligence successfully guesses the drawing or the player runs out of time.

At the end of a Quick, Draw! game, the player is given their drawings and results for each round. They can also view the artificial intelligence's comparisons of their work with other player-given drawings, before either quitting or replaying.

References

External links 
 
 A.I. Experiments at With Google

Google software
Applications of artificial intelligence
Applied machine learning
Browser games
2016 video games